The Embassy of the Democratic People's Republic of Korea in Berlin is the diplomatic mission of North Korea to the Federal Republic of Germany. It is located at Glinkastraße 5–7 in the district Berlin-Mitte. Since 24 April 2017, the ambassador has been Pak Nam-Yong.

According to a UN resolution from 2016 (resolution 2270) it is prohibited to rent or lease North Korea any property. This is to prevent North Korea from generating foreign currency that the People's Republic could use to procure materials for its nuclear program.

The North Korean Embassy rents out its main building to the hotel company EGI GmbH. EGI operates the "City Hostel Berlin" in the building and thus generates foreign exchange for North Korea. All attempts by German authorities to take action against it had been unsuccessful until 2020, when it was closed.

See also
List of diplomatic missions of North Korea
Foreign relations of North Korea

References 

North Korea
Berlin